Abortion in the Solomon Islands is only legal if the abortion will save the mother's life. In Solomon Islands, if an abortion is performed on a woman for any other reason, the violator is subject to a life sentence in prison. A woman who performs a self-induced abortion may also be imprisoned for life.

Any approved abortion requires consent from two physicians as well as the woman's husband or next of kin.

References 

Solomon Islands
Solomon Islands
Human rights abuses in the Solomon Islands